"Live It Up" is a song by the American singer Nicky Jam featuring the American rapper Will Smith and the Kosovo Albanian singer Era Istrefi. It was used as the official song of the 2018 FIFA World Cup held in Russia. The track was produced by Diplo, The Picard Brothers and Free School, and was released on May 25, 2018. The song reached number one in Panama, and the top 10 in Hungary, Poland, Bolivia and Argentina. It received negative reviews, with many criticizing its generic, synthetic sound and detachment between the song's genre and the tournament's host country, Russia.

Live performance
Jam, Smith and Istrefi performed the song at the closing ceremony on 15 July 2018 at the Luzhniki Stadium before the final between France and Croatia.

Music video
The music video for the song was released on June 8, 2018. It shows Jam, Smith and Istrefi, and the Brazilian footballer Ronaldinho, among images from the 2014 tournament. The video was directed by Yasha Malekzad, produced by Kasra Pezeshki and was filmed mainly in Moscow and Budapest, Hungary. By May 2021, the video had amassed over 218 million views on YouTube. However, it was later unlisted, possibly due to Russia's invasion of Ukraine.

Critical reception
The song received mixed to negative reviews. Roisin O'Connor of The Independent rated it with one out of five stars, criticiszed the track's "generic message" and called it a "blatant attempt to cash in on the music industry's current obsession with Latin American music, but the entire song makes zero sense when you remember the World Cup is being held in Russia this year". Ed Malyon of the same outlet criticized its "synthetic joy" and called it "the epitome of a try-hard creation that lacks much of what makes music great–inspiration and raw emotion–and lays on thick the things that we couldn't care less about–meaningless, directionless lyrics and a tiresome wailing from Istrefi, whose songwriting talent has clearly not been drawn on for this tragic effort". Dave Fawbert of ShortList named it the ninth worst World Cup song of all time, criticizing its lyrics: "The words in the chorus just don't fit.  is just unbelieveably clunky", and expressing confusion as to "why a World Cup in Russia should have a reggaeton anthem, while the shoehorning in of different artists in order to satisfy all global demographics is just patently cynical".

The song was met with mixed reviews from fans. Business Standard reported, "'Live It Up' has failed in getting a welcome reception from the fans. People on Twitter are requesting Shakira for a new song. Some have even asked FIFA to change the song." It further highlighted fans' statements that they would stick to K'naan's "Wavin' Flag" and Shakira's "Waka Waka", and the detachment between the song's genre and the tournament's host country. Scroll observed that fans "critiqued the fast pace of what they called was primarily a dance tune, noting the Diplo-produced track lacked a 'football rhythm' to it" and were "nostalgic for popular World Cup anthems in the past such as Shakira's 'Waka Waka' ... and Ricky Martin's 'The Cup of Life'".

Credits and personnel
 Will Smith – composition, vocals
 Nicky Jam – composition, vocals
 Era Istrefi – composition, vocals
 Diplo – production

Charts

Weekly charts

Year-end charts

Certifications

Release history

References

2018 singles
2018 songs
2018 FIFA World Cup
FIFA World Cup official songs and anthems
Nicky Jam songs
Will Smith songs
Era Istrefi songs
Songs written by Nicky Jam
Songs written by Will Smith
Spanglish songs
Songs written by Diplo
Songs written by Quavo
Songs written by Jean-Baptiste (songwriter)
Song recordings produced by Diplo
Sony Music Latin singles